Violet Elizabeth Dowdeswell  (née Patton; born November 9, 1944) is a Canadian public servant who currently serves as the lieutenant governor of Ontario, the 29th since Canadian Confederation. She is the viceregal representative of the King in Right of Ontario.

Early life
Violet Elizabeth Patton was born in Belfast, Northern Ireland, on November 9, 1944. She moved with her family to Canada in 1947, settling in rural Saskatchewan. Her father, Desmond Granville Patton (1920–2008), was a minister of the United Church of Canada. Dowdeswell married at a young age but soon divorced. She attended the University of Saskatchewan and Utah State University, and she later became a teacher and university lecturer.

Career
Dowdeswell left teaching and entered public service as a special assistant to Saskatchewan's deputy education minister for two years (1976-78), then worked as deputy minister of culture and youth during the New Democratic Party government of Allan Blakeney. She was then dismissed, along with other deputy ministers, after the Progressive Conservative government of Grant Devine took power in 1982.

She held various positions in the federal public service during the 1980s, working at one point as assistant deputy minister at Environment Canada with responsibility for the Atmospheric Environment Service and negotiating the Framework Convention on Climate Change. She also led a public inquiry into Canada's unemployment benefits program and federal water policy.

In 1992, Dowdeswell was selected to lead the United Nations Environment Programme in Nairobi, Kenya, serving a full four-year term and a one-year extension until she resigned in 1998.

From 1998 to 2010, she was an adjunct professor at the McLaughlin-Rotman Centre for Global Health at the University of Toronto, while also serving as founding president and CEO of the Nuclear Waste Management Organization. From 2010 until her appointment as Lieutenant Governor, she was the president and CEO of the Council of Canadian Academies.

As lieutenant governor

Dowdeswell was appointed as lieutenant governor by Governor General David Johnston on the advice of Prime Minister Stephen Harper, who selected Dowdeswell from a shortlist devised by the Advisory Committee on Vice-Regal Appointments. On September 23, 2014, she was sworn in during a ceremony held at Queen's Park in Toronto. She is the third woman to serve in the position, after Pauline Mills McGibbon and Hilary Weston.

Dowdeswell declared in her installation address that she would not immediately espouse a particular area of focus during her time as lieutenant governor. Instead, she said she would engage the people of Ontario, listening to their concerns and ideas. She has since adopted sustainability and "Ontario in the world" as personal themes. In addition, Dowdeswell has called herself Ontario's unofficial "Storyteller-in-Chief".

According to annual reports published on her office's website, Dowdeswell has conducted, on average, more than 700 public engagements yearly as lieutenant governor, as well as numerous visits abroad to the United States, the United Kingdom, France, Italy, Switzerland, Germany and Denmark. She has visited all of Ontario's provincial electoral districts.

On September 22, 2022, the Russian Ministry of Foreign Affairs announced the addition of Dowdeswell, alongside other Canadian lieutenant governors, to the country's so-called stop list banning entry to Russian territory.

Titles, styles, honours and arms

Titles and styles
As as lieutenant governor in Canada, Dowdeswell is entitled to be styled "The Honourable" for life and "Her Honour the Honourable" while in office.

Honours

Appointments
  May 24, 2012: Officer of the Order of Canada (OC)
  November 26, 2014: Dame of Justice of the Most Venerable Order of the Hospital of St. John of Jerusalem (DStJ)
 November 26, 2014present: Vice Prior of the Priory of Canada of the Most Venerable Order of the Hospital of St. John of Jerusalem (while in office)
  September 23, 2014: Member of the Order of Ontario (OOnt)
 September 23, 2014present: Chancellor of the Order of Ontario (while in office)

Medals
  June 18, 2012: Queen Elizabeth II Diamond Jubilee Medal
  2022: Queen Elizabeth II Platinum Jubilee Medal (Nova Scotia)

Other awards
 November 18, 2020: Louie Kamookak Medal of the Royal Canadian Geographical Society

Honorary appointments
  September 23, 2014present: Colonel of the Regiment of The Queen's York Rangers (while in office)
  September 23, 2014: Honorary Commissioner of the Ontario Provincial Police

Honorary degrees
Dowdeswell has received several honorary degrees from various universities in Canada and Europe. These include:

Arms

References

External links

 Lieutenant Governor of Ontario

1944 births
Canadian educators
Canadian women viceroys
Canadian women diplomats
Lieutenant Governors of Ontario
Living people
Northern Ireland emigrants to Canada
Officers of the Order of Canada
People from County Antrim
Royal Canadian Geographical Society fellows
Saskatchewan civil servants
United Nations Environment Programme
Under-Secretaries-General of the United Nations
University of Saskatchewan alumni
Academic staff of the University of Toronto
Utah State University alumni
Women in Ontario politics
21st-century Canadian politicians
21st-century Canadian women politicians
Canadian officials of the United Nations